Castelnuovo dell'Abate is a village in Tuscany, central Italy, administratively a frazione of the comune of Montalcino, province of Siena. At the time of the 2001 census its population was 236.

Main sights 
Santi Filippo e Giacomo (15th century), parish church of the village
Abbey of Sant'Antimo

References 

Frazioni of Montalcino